Dapper Dan may refer to:


People
Daniel B. Burnett Jr. (1905–1976), wing designer of the Spirit of St. Louis plane flown by Charles Lindbergh
Frank Daley (1908–1968), Canadian hockey player
Dan Howley (1885–1944), American baseball player
Dapper Dan (designer) (born 1944), African-American fashion designer and haberdasher Daniel Day

Arts and entertainment
Dapper Dan The Magnetic Man, a 1950s era toy
A song by South Florida-based rapper Ski Mask the Slump God on his 2018 mixtape Beware the Book of Eli
"Dapper Dan" Greco, a character in the 1947 Bowery Boys film News Hounds

Sports
Dapper Dan (horse), an American racehorse of the 1960s
Dapper Dan Open, a former PGA Tour professional golf tournament
Dapper Dan Charities, Pittsburgh's oldest (since 1936) and largest sports charity

See also
The Dapper Dans, a barbershop quartet that performs at various Disney theme parks
"Dapper" Danny Hogan (1880–1928), American gangster

Lists of people by nickname